Scott Thomas McLaughlin (born 10 June 1993) is a New Zealand racing driver. He currently competes in the IndyCar Series, driving the No. 3 Dallara-Chevrolet for Team Penske. He previously raced in the Supercars Championship, in which he won the drivers' title in 2018, 2019 and 2020.

McLaughlin won the 2012 Dunlop V8 Supercar Series and made his Supercars Championship debut at the 2012 Dick Smith Sandown 500 as a co-driver to Jonathon Webb at Tekno Autosports. Having made a substitute appearance for Garry Rogers Motorsport at the final event of 2012, McLaughlin was signed by the team to compete full-time in the 2013 season. He took his first race victory in the sixth race of the year, becoming the youngest driver to win a Supercars Championship race, and went on to finish his rookie season in tenth place. McLaughlin remained with the team for the next three seasons and enjoyed continued success, recording 17 pole positions and eight race victories for the team, with a best championship placing of third in 2016.

In July 2016 it was announced that McLaughlin would join DJR Team Penske for the 2017 Supercars Championship. He enjoyed immediate success with the team, taking a record 16 pole positions during the season as well as eight race victories. McLaughlin finished runner-up to Jamie Whincup in the championship, with Whincup securing his seventh championship title in the final race of the season. The following season, McLaughlin took his maiden championship title after a close battle with Whincup's teammate Shane van Gisbergen in the second half of the year. In 2019, McLaughlin dominantly won his second championship, winning a record 18 races during the season, including the Bathurst 1000, and securing the title with one event remaining. McLaughlin completed a hat-trick of championship wins in 2020, taking a further 13 race victories.

During 2020 it was announced that McLaughlin would join the IndyCar Series with Team Penske in 2021. He made his debut at the 2020 Firestone Grand Prix of St. Petersburg.

Early life
McLaughlin was born in Hamilton, New Zealand but moved to Australia's Gold Coast at 9 years of age and attended Saint Stephen's College throughout his upbringing.

Junior and early racing career

Karting
McLaughlin began racing karts in 1999 at the Kartsport Hamilton circuit outside of Hamilton, New Zealand, winning his first title in 2002. After his family relocated to the Gold Coast in 2003, McLaughlin began contesting Australian titles while also continuing to compete in New Zealand. In 2008, McLaughlin represented New Zealand in the Junior class at the Rotax Max Challenge Grand Finals, alongside Nick Cassidy. Starting the Final in sixth place, McLaughlin was involved in an incident on the first lap and eventually finished 19th.

V8 Supercar Development Series
McLaughlin was part of the Britek Motorsport scholarship in 2008, which saw him working closely with team owner and Supercars race winner Jason Bright. McLaughlin attended the 2008 Bathurst 1000 with the team, spending time in the pit garage and seeing the inner workings of the team. McLaughlin completed a week of work experience with Stone Brothers Racing (SBR) in 2009, after which he was offered a four-year apprenticeship with the team, starting in 2010. On 17 December 2009, the team gave McLaughlin his first test in a V8 Supercar. He recorded over 70 laps at Queensland Raceway, driving one of the team's Ford BF Falcons. McLaughlin impressed during the test, recording lap times just over one second slower than those of the SBR's full-time V8 Supercar drivers Alex Davison and Shane van Gisbergen.

McLaughlin was signed by SBR to contest the 2010 Fujitsu V8 Supercar Series in a BF Falcon. Due to his limited racing experience in cars, McLaughlin was unable to attain the required competition licence to compete in the first round of the series; he instead took part in the first two rounds of the Australian Mini Challenge and completed a single round of the Victorian Formula Ford Series. He eventually made his debut in the second round at Queensland Raceway, becoming the youngest ever driver to race a V8 Supercar. McLaughlin qualified in seventh position, just under a second behind the pole position time of championship leader Steve Owen, and finished ninth in the first race of the weekend. The finishing order of the top ten was reversed to form the grid for Race 2, meaning that McLaughlin started the second race on the front row. He overheated the clutch during the start procedure and was unable to move his car when the race started. He was hit by Owen Kelly and Ryan Hansford, with the car suffering severe damage and taking McLaughlin out of the rest of the event. He went on to finish the season twelfth in the championship, with a best qualifying result of second at Sydney Olympic Park and a best race result of fourth at Winton Motor Raceway. McLaughlin suffered a heavy crash at Mount Panorama, hitting the wall at the Reid Park section of the circuit during the first race of the weekend.

McLaughlin remained with SBR in 2011 and scored his first podium in the opening round at Adelaide, finishing seventh and second in the two races to be classified third overall. He followed this up with a pair of third-place finishes at Barbagallo Raceway, moving up to second in the championship. After struggling in the third round at Townsville, McLaughlin secured his first race victory at Queensland Raceway. Having qualified second behind championship leader Andrew Thompson, McLaughlin took the lead at the start of the first race and went on to win by two seconds. Six further top-five race finishes in the remaining rounds of the season saw McLaughlin finish fourth in the championship, having updated to a newer FG Falcon at the penultimate round of the championship.

McLaughlin remained with SBR for the opening two rounds of the 2012 season before moving to Matt Stone Racing, a satellite team of SBR, for the remainder of the year. McLaughlin prevailed in a close title fight with Chaz Mostert, Scott Pye and Nick Percat; the quartet became known as the Dunlop Series' "Class of 2012", with all four drivers going on to become race winners in the Supercars Championship. McLaughlin scored his first round win in the series at Barbagallo Raceway, backing it up with another victory at Townsville. Another podium finish at Queensland Raceway gave McLaughlin an 88-point lead over Mostert with three rounds remaining. While on course to finish second in the first race at Mount Panorama, McLaughlin suffered a puncture which dropped him to 13th place. Despite recovering to finish sixth in the second race, McLaughlin left the event with a 20-point deficit to Mostert in the championship. Percat and Pye finished first and second in the penultimate round at Winton, while McLaughlin finished fifth; the results saw McLaughlin take a 32-point lead over Percat into the final round at Sydney Olympic Park, with both Mostert and Pye less than 100 points adrift. McLaughlin won the opening race of the final round, with incidents for Percat and Mostert giving him a comfortable points lead heading into the final race of the season. A third-place finish saw him secure the title with a 73-point margin over Pye.

V8 SuperTourer Series
McLaughlin drove a Holden VE Commodore in the 2012 season of the V8 SuperTourer Series. He won six races for MPC Motorsport on his way to becoming the inaugural series champion.

Supercars Championship

McLaughlin made his debut in the Supercars Championship at the Sandown 500 in 2012, as a co-driver to Jonathon Webb at Tekno Autosports. The pair performed well at both Sandown and Bathurst, finishing in tenth place at Sandown and in sixth place at Bathurst. McLaughlin also drove at the Sydney 500 for Garry Rogers Motorsport after Alexandre Prémat was forced out of the Sunday race due to extreme heat exhaustion the day before. McLaughlin was later signed by Garry Rogers Motorsport as a full-time driver for the 2013 season.

McLaughlin continued with Garry Rogers Motorsport into 2014, under its new identity as Volvo Polestar Racing (later Volvo Cyan Racing). On 1 March 2014, McLaughlin scored a podium finish in Volvo's return to the series at the Clipsal 500 Adelaide. Four race wins at Barbagallo, Sydney Motorsport Park, and 2 wins at Phillip Island. He finished 5th in the standings.

DJR Team Penske

2017 

For 2017, McLaughlin moved from Garry Rogers Motorsport to DJR Team Penske to partner Fabian Coulthard. Throughout the year, McLaughlin was dominant in qualifying; acquiring 16 pole positions. Along with a string of strong results, McLaughlin would find himself in the box seat for a maiden championship title. After starting strongly in the final round at Newcastle, a chaotic second race saw McLaughlin pick up three penalties which would eventually contribute toward him narrowly missing out on the title to Jamie Whincup.

2018 

In 2018, McLaughlin continued to race with DJR Team Penske. He won seven out of the 34 races, winning in Melbourne, Phillip Island, Barbagallo, Hidden Valley, and Ipswich. McLaughlin finished third at Bathurst alongside Alexandre Prémat in which was the Ford Falcon's final appearance at Mount Panorama. On 4 November, at Pukekohe Park Raceway, McLaughlin won race twenty-nine to join compatriot Shane van Gisbergen in winning the Jason Richards Memorial Trophy. In Newcastle, McLaughlin won race thirty (after van Gisbergen was stripped of his victory following a pit lane violation, demoting him to fifth) and finished second in race thirty-one to become the 2018 Virgin Australia Supercars champion.

2019 

In 2019, DJR Team Penske debuted the Ford Mustang, which replaced the Falcon. McLaughlin was able to continue his dominance with the team, with 18 wins, which broke the record for most wins in a single year, 15 pole positions, 18 fastest laps, and 22 podiums to his name. He became the first-ever driver to claim the Darwin Triple Crown, after winning the first race, claiming pole for the second race, and winning the second race. On 13 October 2019. McLaughlin finally won Bathurst for the first time, with Alexandre Prémat as Scott's co-driver. Two weeks after this he had the biggest crash of his career, a 43g impact at the Gold Coast. He then had to drive a new car, due to chassis damage from the crash, for the last two rounds and was still able to successfully defend his championship title, with a round to go at Sandown.

2020 
In a 2020 season shortened by the COVID-19 Pandemic McLaughlin won his third consecutive and to date last Supercars Championship and the final championship for DJR Team Penske. He scored thirteen wins on the season to go with eight podium finishes and fifteen pole positions.

2021 
McLaughlin and Team Penske attempted to partner with Dick Johnson Racing again to field a car for the 2021 Bathurst 1000 but due to pandemic-related travel restrictions, he was not able to attend the race. McLaughlin stated that in future seasons he intends to compete within the Bathurst 1000 with Team Penske's backing after he completes the IndyCar season.

IndyCar
Speculation around McLaughlin moving to one of Penske's other motorsports programs began in 2019 when Penske team president Tim Cindric and McLaughlin met in Australia to discuss McLaughlin's future in the Penske organization. Cindric originally envisioned moving McLaughlin to Penske's WeatherTech SportsCar Championship program to race alongside Helio Castroneves in Penske's Acura Daytona Prototype International entry and potentially competing in the World Endurance Championship. McLaughlin however expressed interest in moving to Penske's team in the Indycar Series. He stated his primary motivators were the challenge of racing open-wheel race cars, his long time goal of racing in the Indianapolis 500, and competing against his childhood hero and fellow New Zealander Scott Dixon. Cindric was skeptical about moving McLaughlin to Indycar as McLaughlin had not driven an open-wheel racecar since he raced in Formula Ford. McLaughlin changed Cindric's mind by altering his strength and conditioning regimen along with undertaking private simulator time that to show he had the talent and physical fitness to move from the mechanical grip reliant Supercars to the downforce reliant Dallara DW12, all during the middle of the 2019 Supercars Championship.

In January 2020, he tested a Team Penske IndyCar at Sebring International Raceway. Team Penske driver Will Power hailed McLaughlin as a phenomenal driver after the test. In February 2020 McLaughlin completed his first laps on an oval during Team Penske's test at Texas Motor Speedway, with reigning Indycar Series champion and future teammate Josef Newgarden hailing McLaughlin's ability to quickly adapt to the demands of racing the DW12 on ovals. On 5 February, Penske announced that McLaughlin will race a 4th Team Penske entry at the Grand Prix of Indianapolis. However, due to the COVID-19 pandemic, McLaughlin was unable to travel to the United States for that race. On 17 September, Team Penske announced that McLaughlin will instead make his IndyCar debut at the Firestone Grand Prix of St. Petersburg on 25 October. The day before the race he posted on his personal Instagram feed that he signed a multi year contract with Penske to compete full time in the series.

2021

On January 25, 2021, McLaughlin and Penske announced that PPG Paints would be the primary sponsor for most of his entries in the Indycar series in his rookie year, while Florida based office technology supplier DEX Imaging and used car outlet Car Shop would sponsor him for select events. For the 2021 Indianapolis 500 he drove a Pennzoil-sponsored car, with the livery paying homage to that company's famed "Yellow Submarine" designs of the 1980s. Going into his rookie IndyCar season both Tim Cindric and Roger Penske let McLaughlin know that he was not expected to compete for wins and that his primary goal would be to finish all the races.

McLaughlin spent 2021 learning the different aspects of IndyCar racing. In addition to coming to grips with a car reliant on downforce rather than mechanical grip McLaughlin also had to learn how to drive a turbocharged car with temperature-sensitive tires and carbon-ceramic brakes, all aspects that were drastically different from the cars he raced in the Supercars Championship. McLaughlin admitted after the season that his biggest struggle of the season was learning how to build and manage the temperature of the tires and brakes, which is more critical and difficult in an open-wheel racecar like an IndyCar than it is in a touring car that McLaughlin was used to racing. In qualifying for road street course races, which made up 75% of the IndyCar calendar, McLaughlin struggled through the first three-quarters of the season with understanding how to build and maintain an optimal temperature in the tires and brakes in the short amount of time given in IndyCar qualifying on the road and street courses. These struggles in qualifying meant McLaughlin started with an average position of sixteenth on the road and street courses, meaning he would have to fight his way through traffic and work harder for the position despite recording a slightly above average 4.5 overtakes per race. He recorded his first fast six qualifying slot and first top ten finish on a road course at the first race on the IMS Road Course, where he qualified sixth and finished eighth. McLaughlin would struggle on road and street courses after the Indianapolis 500 and did not pick up another top ten finish on a road course until he finished ninth at Portland.

McLaughlin's strongest performances in his rookie season were on the ovals, with the strongest moment of his rookie season coming in the first race at Texas Motor Speedway, the Genesys 300. In his first race ever on an oval McLaughlin started fifteenth due to qualifying being canceled by inclement weather, forcing the drivers to line up based on their championship points standings. Despite this technicality McLaughlin got his first IndyCar podium by finishing second to Scott Dixon. Not only did McLaughlin finish ahead of Tony Kanaan and Pietro Fittipaldi (who filled in for Johnson and Grosjean respectively), he finished ahead of all his Penske teammates and all the active drivers who had won the Indianapolis 500 other than Dixon; Takuma Sato, Alexander Rossi, Ryan Hunter-Reay, Tony Kanaan, and teammates Will Power and Simon Pagenaud. He picked up further top ten finishes in the second race in Texas and at Gateway. When asked why his performances on ovals were better than on road and street courses despite having never raced on them before McLaughlin stated that it largely came down to the oval qualifying format being similar to that in the Supercars Championship and that the IndyCar oval tires came to temperature significantly faster than the road and street course tires, giving him the confidence to push harder on ovals than he did on road and street courses.

During the run-up and qualifying for the 105th Indianapolis 500 McLaughlin was mentored by former Penske driver and four-time Indianapolis 500 winner Rick Mears. Although Mears advised all the Penske drivers he focused the most on preparing McLaughlin for the 500. Mears' mentorship paid off for McLaughlin and led to him qualifying seventeenth on the grid, the highest Penske driver in what was considered Penske's worst qualifying performance for the 500 since 1995. During the race McLaughlin ran for large portions at the back of the top ten before incurring a drive-through penalty on lap 116 for speeding in the pit lane, leading to a twentieth place finish. For his efforts McLaughlin was named Indianapolis 500 Rookie Of The Year, the third Penske driver to be named so along with Mears and race winner Helio Castroneves.

The main narrative surrounding McLaughlin's rookie season was his place in a unique class of IndyCar rookies that included NASCAR Cup Series champion Jimmie Johnson and Formula One veteran Romain Grosjean, with many pundits speculating which of the three, would have the strongest season. McLaughlin would be the only one of the three to run a full schedule in  2021, as Johnson opted not to race on any of the oval courses and Grosjean only chose to race at one of the four oval races. While Johnson would take the longest of the three to adapt to IndyCar racing McLaughlin and Grosjean were frequently measured against one another on the track. McLaughlin only outdueled Grosjean four times in their rookie season; at St. Petersburg when he raced there for the second time in six months, at Grosjean's first oval race at Gateway, and at Portland and Long Beach when Grosjean was caught up in accidents caused by other drivers early in both races. This meant that Grosjean had a chance at winning the IndyCar Rookie of the Year award despite not running a full schedule and McLaughlin racing in the double points earning Indianapolis 500. The two drivers largely downplayed the comparisons to one another, with Grosjean stating it was unfair to compare the two given his nearly two decades of open-wheel racing experience while McLaughlin only had one season in open-wheel racing before him joining the IndyCar Series.

2022
 2022 McLaughlin would put together all that he learned in his rookie season and became a championship contender in IndyCar. He took his first IndyCar win at the season opener at St. Petersburg, took a second win later in the season at Mid Ohio, and a third win on the season at Portland. He picked up additional podium finishes at Texas, the second race at Iowa, Nashville, and Gateway, along with earning three pole positions on the season. McLaughin would go into the season finale at Laguna Seca as one of five drivers contending for the Astor Cup, despite crashing out of the Indianapolis 500 and missing out on double points. He ultimately finished fourth in the championship standings.

2023 
McLaughlin agreed on a multi-year deal to remain with Team Penske from 2023 onwards.

Motorsports career results

Supercars Championship results
(Races in bold indicate pole position) (Races in italics indicate fastest lap)

Bathurst 1000 results

V8 SuperTourer results

Scandinavian Touring Car Championship results
(key) (Races in bold indicate pole position) (Races in italics indicate fastest lap)

American open–wheel racing results
(key)

IndyCar Series
(key)

Indianapolis 500

Complete IMSA SportsCar Championship results
(key) (Races in bold indicate pole position; results in italics indicate fastest lap)

† Points only counted towards the Michelin Endurance Cup, and not the overall LMP2 Championship.
* Season still in progress.

Personal life
McLaughlin is married to Karly Paone, a schoolteacher from Long Island. The two met by chance in 2016 in Las Vegas when McLaughlin made the trip to help a fellow racer competing in an international karting tournament. Paone moved to Australia with McLaughlin in 2018 and the two were married in 2020. After McLaughlin moved from Supercars to the IndyCar Series he and Karly relocated to North Carolina to be closer to Team Penske's headquarters.

McLaughlin has a dog named Chase. He began watching American team sports after he met his wife and is a fan of the New York Mets, New York Knicks, and Carolina Panthers.

References

External links
 Scott McLaughlin Official Website updated by in 2018
 
 Profile on Racing Reference

1993 births
Living people
New Zealand racing drivers
Supercars Championship drivers
V8SuperTourer drivers
Swedish Touring Car Championship drivers
IndyCar Series drivers
Indianapolis 500 drivers
Indianapolis 500 Rookies of the Year
Stone Brothers Racing drivers
Matt Stone Racing drivers
Garry Rogers Motorsport drivers
Dick Johnson Racing drivers
Team Penske drivers
Bathurst 1000 winners
McLaren Racing drivers
WeatherTech SportsCar Championship drivers